Lamanère is a commune in the Pyrénées-Orientales department in southern France.

It is the southernmost village of Continental France.

Geography 
Lamanère is located in the canton of Le Canigou and in the arrondissement of Céret.

Population

See also
Communes of the Pyrénées-Orientales department
Bray-Dunes, the northernmost commune of Continental France

References

Communes of Pyrénées-Orientales